Wascar Radames Serrano (born June 2, 1977 in Santo Domingo, Dominican Republic) is a Dominican former professional baseball pitcher. He played part of one season in Major League Baseball for the San Diego Padres in 2001. After pitching in 2003 for the independent Kansas City T-Bones of the Northern League, he pitched part of the 2005 season in the Mexican League for the Piratas de Campeche and the Leones de Yucatán before retiring.

External links

1977 births
Arizona League Padres players
Clinton LumberKings players
Dominican Republic expatriate baseball players in Mexico
Dominican Republic expatriate baseball players in the United States
Guerreros de Oaxaca players
Idaho Falls Braves players
Kansas City T-Bones players
Las Vegas Stars (baseball) players

Leones de Yucatán players
Living people
Major League Baseball pitchers
Major League Baseball players from the Dominican Republic
Mexican League baseball pitchers
Mobile BayBears players
Piratas de Campeche players
Portland Beavers players
Rancho Cucamonga Quakes players
San Diego Padres players
Tacoma Rainiers players